Isabel of Conches, (fl. 1090) wife of Ralph of Tosny, rode armed like a knight during a conflict in northern France during the late 11th century  and was born in Montfort sur Risle, Eure, Normandy, in 1057.

Early life
She was the daughter of Simon I de Montfort.

Marriage and issue
Isabel married Raoul II of Tosny, they had:

Roger, died young.
Raoul IV de Conches, married Alice of Huntingdon, daughter of Waltheof, Earl of Northumbria, and Judith of Lens.
Godehilde married Baldwin I of Jerusalem

The legend
The chronicler Orderic Vitalis in the Ecclesiastical history describes Isabel in some detail.

Orderic describes Isabel "joyful, generous, daring and well loved by all." He describes her in the hall of Conches, listening to knights talk about their dreams. Isabel unfortunately also had a conflictual relationship with her sister-in-law, Helewise of Evreux. The disagreement reached a point that her husband took up arms against William, Count of Évreux. Both families came to open war in 1091–92, when William attacked Conches.

During the ensueing conflict, Isabel is said to have worn armor, joined her knights on the battlefield. The chronicler describes her in the following manner:

“ In war she rode armed as a knight among the knights; and she showed no less courage among the knights in hauberks and sergeants-at-arms than did the maid Camilla, the pride of Italy, among the troops of Turnus. She deserved comparison with Lampeto and Marpesia, Hippolyta and Penthesilea and the other warlike Amazon queens”
He gives no further description of her role in the battle. Isabel may have encouraged the knights or she perhaps fought actively, as the comparisons to these warlike heroines seem to suggest.

A settlement was finally reached between the warring families.

Later life and death
According to the chronicle, Isabel ended up in a nunnery where she “worthily reformed her life”. Isabel died on 24 April 1102, in Saint-Rémy-l'Honoré, Yvelines, Île-de-France, France, at the age of 44, and was buried in Rambouillet, Seine-et-Oise, Île-de-France, France.

References

Bibliography
 Johns, Susan M. Noblewomen, aristocracy and power in the twelfth-century Anglo-Norman realm. Manchester University Press, 2003, p. 14.
 Isabel de Conches is mistress of Walter Tirel in historical novel The Paladin and its successor The Wolf Time by British writer George Shipway. She fights in battles alongside her husband Ralph de Conches and lover Walter Tirel.

Medieval French knights
Women in medieval European warfare
Women in war in France
11th-century French women
11th-century French people
Women in 11th-century warfare